The Mercury Marauder is an automobile nameplate that was used by three distinct full-size cars produced by the Mercury division of Ford Motor Company. Deriving its name from the most powerful engines available to the Mercury line, the Marauder was marketed as the highest-performance version of the full-size product range.

Introduced as a 1963 model line for its first production run, the Mercury Marauder was distinguished by its fastback-styled roofline (shared with the Ford Galaxie).  The nameplate was a sub-model of the three Mercury model lines (Monterey, Monterey Custom, and S-55).   

For 1966, the Marauder was replaced by the Mercury S-55 as a stand-alone model line, which remained the Mercury counterpart of the Ford Galaxie 500XL.   

For the 1969 model year, the Marauder returned as a fastback version of the Mercury Marquis. Designed to bridge the gap between the Mercury Cougar and Continental Mark III, the Mercury Marauder was repackaged as a personal luxury car.  Following the 1970 model year, the model line was discontinued.   

For the 2003 model year, the Mercury Marauder nameplate was revived as a high-performance variant of the full-size Grand Marquis using the Ford Panther platform. After lower than expected sales, the Marauder was discontinued at the end of the 2004 model year.  As of current production, the Mercury Marauder remains the final rear-wheel drive sedan introduced by Ford Motor Company in North America.

Origin of name 
The Marauder name made its first appearance in 1958 as Ford introduced a new family of V8 engines for its Mercury, Edsel, and Lincoln brands; the Marauder nameplate was in reference to people associated with outlaws or piracy.  Within the engine family, two V8 engines were exclusive to the Mercury division.

Dubbed Marauder, a 383 cubic-inch V8 produced 330hp with an optional 4-barrel carburetor.  In that configuration, the engine was offered in the midline Montclair and the Colony Park station wagon.    

Dubbed Super Marauder, a 430 cubic-inch V8 produced 400hp (the first mass-produced engine sold in the United States with an advertised 400hp output).  While the 430 V8 was shared with Lincoln, the Super Marauder was given its own set of intake manifolds and "tri-power" 3x2-barrel carburetors.  Offered for the entire Mercury line, the Super Marauder was developed as a competitor for the 392 Hemi of the Chrysler 300C high-performance coupe.

For 1959, Mercury revised its V8 engine offerings; while the Super Marauder V8 was discontinued, the 430 V8 remained (retuned with slightly reduced engine output).  For 1960, the Marauder V8 became an option across the Mercury line, including the Monterey, Park Lane, and Commuter.

For 1961, full-size Mercury vehicles adopted a greater degree of commonality with their Ford counterparts, with Mercury dropping the 383 and 430 large-block engines entirely.  The Marauder name returned, moving from the 383 MEL V8 to Ford-based FE V8 engines.

First generation (1963–1965)

The Mercury Marauder nameplate made its debut in 1963 1/2 as a model of each of the three Mercury full-size series, including the Monterey, Monterey Custom, and S-55. For the first time for a mid-year introduction, the Marauder was introduced as a "1963" model (as was an entire line of new, "sports" models from Ford in many of the existing series). All 1963 Marauders were "fastbacks", in  two-door form only. The two-door notchback (Breezeway) hardtop coupe was listed at US$3,650 ($ in  dollars ) and  3,863 were manufactured.   For model year 1964, the Marauder model was available in the base Monterey trim, next level Montclair or top of the line Parklane.  Marauders were now available as four-door cars.

In contrast to the distinctive reverse-slant "Breezeway" roofline option on Mercury's full-size models, the Marauder hardtop coupe was styled with a conventional sloping notchback rear roofline as well as a fastback appearance. It was the same roofline introduced at the same time on the contemporary Ford Galaxies. This roofline was optimized to make the large sedan more competitive for stock car racing. Along with the "sportier" roofline, the Marauder  S-55 trim package included bucket seats and a center console, similar to its Ford counterpart. However, the base model Marauder came with a front bench seat and a column shift unlike the S-55 package. 

For 1964, the availability of Mercury Marauder expanded to four-door hardtops; along with two-doors, four-door hardtops also included a fastback roofline. The "Breezeway" roofline models continued as before. 

Shared with the rest of the Mercury sedan line, the Mercury Marauder was powered by Ford "FE-Series" V8 engines, shared with the big Fords and the Thunderbird. A 390 cubic-inch Marauder V8 was standard,  along with a 4V 427 cubic inch and a  2  4V  427 cubic-inch Super Marauder V8 as options.  Along with 3-speed and 4-speed manual transmissions (4 speed mandatory with the 427 ), a 3-speed "Merc-O-Matic" automatic transmission was offered.

For 1965, Mercury advertising emphasized the car's luxury and close relationship with Lincoln. The Marauder option continued to be offered in all three series (Park Lane, Montclair, and Monterey) in two- or four-door hardtop body styles. These models were not promoted and not even mentioned in dealer brochures. Marauders featured a small emblem (with flag) on the "C" pillar to distinguish them from other models. All full-size Mercury hardtop coupes got the same "slant back" roofline as in the big Ford, which was basically a more sharply-angled version of the 1964 Marauder roofline. Four-door hardtops got a new formal "limousine" styled notchback roofline that was shared with Ford's Galaxie hardtop sedans. Mercury continued to advertise the big-block FE-series V8s as "Marauder" engines.

For the 1966 model year, as Mercury shifted away from full-size performance vehicles, the Marauder was replaced by a repackaged S-55. The move also consolidated the options of three model lines into a distinct nameplate.

Second generation (1969–1970)

For the 1969 model year, Mercury returned the Marauder nameplate to its product line. Positioned as a personal luxury car, the Marauder replaced the performance-oriented S-55 and sought to appeal to the interest generated by the Lincoln Continental Mark III introduced in 1968 and the Mercury Cougar while competing for buyers of the 1969 Ford Thunderbird.

Slotted below the Marquis in size, the Marauder was derived from multiple Mercury and Ford vehicles. Sharing its fastback roofline with the Ford XL and Ford Galaxie 500 SportsRoof, the Marauder shared its front sheet metal, interior trim and concealed headlights with the Marquis. The Marauder shared its 121-inch wheelbase with Ford sedans and the Colony Park station wagon. Similar to other 1960s vehicles with fastback rooflines, its rear window was "tunneled", with large rear C-pillars. The rear quarter panels featured non-functional louvered side air intakes. The listed retail price was US$3,351 ($ in  dollars ) and 9,031 were sold.

By the end of the 1960s, demand for high-performance full-size cars had largely disappeared. In total, Mercury would sell about 15,000 examples for 1969, and barely a third of that for 1970; in comparison to the Marauder, Mercury would sell nearly 173,000 Cougars at the same time. Within the Lincoln-Mercury Division, the far more expensive Continental Mark III outsold the Marauder more than two-to-one from 1969 to 1970.

Powertrain
Standard versions of the Marauder were equipped with the  Ford FE engine and a manual 3-speed transmission. The Marauder X-100 was only equipped with the   engine with a 3-speed FMX automatic as an option. The only transmission available with the 429 was the 3-speed Ford C6 automatic.

Mercury Marauder X-100 
To offer a higher-performance version of the Marauder, Mercury introduced the Marauder X-100. While nearly all features of the X-100 were cosmetic, the Marauder X-100 offered a choice of twin comfort lounge seats, bench seat, or bucket seats with a floor console housing a U-shaped automatic transmission shift handle. The X-100 also featured Kelsey-Hayes road wheels along with rear fender skirts, and was listed at US$4,074 ($ in  dollars ) selling 9,031 examples.

Revival (2003–2004)

For the 2003 model year, Mercury revived the Marauder nameplate after a 33-year hiatus. Similar in concept to its 1960s namesake, the new Marauder offered upgraded chassis, suspension, and powertrain components over the standard Grand Marquis. For the first time since 1960, Mercury offered a full-size sedan with no Ford counterpart, developing it as a marketplace successor to the 1994-1996 Chevrolet Impala SS. When the Marauder was cancelled, Chrysler reintroduced the 2005 Chrysler 300 as a rear-drive luxury sedan with the all-new Hemi V8.

The introduction of the Marauder launched a near-complete replenishment of the Mercury model line. Though the Grand Marquis sedan and Mountaineer SUV would remain in production, from 2004 to 2006, Mercury introduced the Monterey minivan (2004) and Mariner SUV (2005); the Sable was replaced by the Montego and Milan sedans (2005 and 2006).

After the end of the 2004 model year, the Marauder was discontinued with no direct Mercury or Ford replacement. Initially predicted for sales of 18,000 vehicles per year, the revived Marauder sold slowly, with only 11,052 sold over its two-year production (compared to nearly 180,000 Grand Marquis sold in the same time). In a key marketing success, the Marauder attracted younger buyers into Lincoln-Mercury showrooms; the average age of its buyer (51) was 18 years younger than that of the Grand Marquis (69).

Development 
At the 2002 Chicago Auto Show, Ford introduced the Mercury Marauder as a concept car. Serving as a preview of the production vehicle, the 2002 concept car was a five-passenger, two-door convertible. Starting life as a 1999 Ford Crown Victoria LX, the body was reconfigured and the 215hp 4.6 L V8 replaced by a 335hp supercharged 4.6 L SOHC V8.

The first full-sized convertible produced by Ford since the 1972 Ford LTD convertible and the first full-sized two-door sedan (by Ford) since 1987, the Marauder convertible was strictly intended as a concept car. At the time of its development, production of the 2-door convertible was under consideration, related to consumer demand.

Chassis 
The 2003–2004 Marauder utilized the Panther platform, adopting the chassis upgrades introduced as part of its 2003 update (including the introduction of rack-and-pinion steering). The Marauder also used heavier-duty brake and suspension components from the Ford Crown Victoria Police Interceptor. 

For production Marauders, Mercury used a 302hp 4.6L DOHC V8; an evolution of the Lincoln Mark VIII engine, the V8 was shared with the Mustang Mach 1 and Lincoln Aviator. For 2003, the engine used a 4-speed 4R70W automatic, switching to a 4R75W automatic for 2004.

The Marauder shared its limited-slip differential (and 3.55:1 rear-axle ratio) with the Crown Victoria Police Interceptor, along with its aluminum driveshaft.

Body 
In line with the B-body Chevrolet Impala SS, the 2003 Marauder was given a monochromatic appearance, with a wide majority of cars sold in black. In contrast to the Grand Marquis, the only chrome on the Marauder is its window trim, wheels, and Mercury emblems on the grille and trunklid.

On the exterior, the Marauder shares most of its trim with the Grand Marquis; much of the rear and side trim is shared with the Crown Victoria LX Sport. Both bumpers are unique to the Marauder; the rear features the model name embossed on the bumper and is modified further to accommodate the larger Megs chrome tailpipe tips. The front bumper was redesigned with a central air intake added to improve engine ventilation; round Cibié fog lamps were added below the headlights. The headlight and corner light lenses (from the Grand Marquis) had their non-reflective surfaces blacked out and the grille was painted black with a body-color surround. The taillight and reverse light lenses (from the Crown Victoria LX Sport) were dark-tinted to the minimum of DOT standards. Unique to the Marauder, the 18-inch five-spoke wheels have center caps with a revival of a 1960s Mercury emblem (a silhouette of the Roman god Mercury).

The interior of the Marauder resembled the configuration of the 2002 concept convertible, adopting a five-seat layout with a center console-mounted transmission shifter (shared with the Crown Victoria LX Sport and Grand Marquis LSE). Leather seating was standard, with (simulated) satin aluminum trim replacing wood trim. Unique to the Marauder, the instrument panel was redesigned, with aluminum-finish gauges, a 140-mph speedometer; unique among Panther platform vehicles (at the time), the Marauder was fitted with a tachometer, requiring the relocation of the voltmeter and oil pressure gauges (forward of the shifter).

Sales

References

Further reading 
 Edmunds.com, 2003 Marauder Review
 AutomobileMag.com, 2003–2004 Mercury Marauder, Joe Lorio
 Car and Driver, July 2002, 2003 Mercury Marauder - Reviews / Road Tests, John Phillips
 Car and Driver, 2004 Mercury Marauder, User Road Tests
 Motor Trend, July 2002, Merc Meets Merc, Marauder and S500: Two cool, bad-ass powerbrokers on the run, Todd Lassa
 JD Power Quality Survey, 2003 Mercury Marauder

External links

 

Marauder
Rear-wheel-drive vehicles
Full-size vehicles
Cars introduced in 1963
1960s cars
1970s cars
Cars introduced in 2003
Ford Panther platform
Personal luxury cars